The Fountain Hills Unified School District is a public school district in Maricopa County, Arizona, US, based in Fountain Hills, Arizona.

Schools
The Fountain Hills Unified School District has one elementary school, one middle school, and one high school.

Elementary school 
 McDowell Mountain Elementary School

Middle school
 Fountain Hills Middle School

High school
 Fountain Hills High School

References

External links
 District website
 Fountain Hills High School
 Fountain Hills Middle School
 McDowell Mountain Elementary School
 Arizona Department of Education

School districts in Maricopa County, Arizona
Fountain Hills, Arizona